IRIB TV2 (Shabakeh-ye Do, lit. Channel 2) is one of the 40 national television channels in Iran. It broadcasts to the Persian-speaking areas of the Middle East and is headquartered in Tehran.

The Islamic Republic of Iran Broadcasting decided to introduce the channel as a result of Iran's growing population, intending to make it a complement to the already-established IRIB TV1. The channel has a variety of programming similar to IRIB TV1, including miniseries, comedies, children's shows, talk shows, news broadcasts, and original television films.

According to Iran IRIB new policies,Since 6 March 2022,Its all News programs that held from IRIIB difference channels joint to each other and after it,they will hold on in a News channel,by means of it those  News sections which hold on 8,14,19,21Clock from IRIB TV 1 before it,all of them transferred to IRINN channel although it will hold on IRIB TV1 too,but it is not include News 19 Program.Besides of it other News programs like Special News Negotiation so called to (Ghoftegoyeh Vegeh Khabari) in Iran mixed by Tonight Titer so called to (Titer Emshab) that first one held in IRIB TV 2 and second ones from IRINN and it hold on as Special News Negotiation so called to (Ghoftegoyeh Vegeh Khabari) from IRINN after it. This changes not only limited to these news programs and backgrounds but as Iranian IRIB responsible claimed it will advance to other IRIB parts.

Programming

Original
Fitile Jome Tatile
Sandali Dagh
Varzeshe 2
Pedar Salar (1993)
Hamsaran (1994)
Saate Khosh (1994)
Dar Panahe To (1994)
Khane sabz (1996)
The Forbidden Fruit (2007)
Dasdasi (2012)
 Good, Bad, Ugly (2015)
 Hidden Government (2015)
 Hanieh (2015)
 Kimia (2016)
 Eight and a half minutes (2016)

Acquired 
Dae Jang Geum (2008)
Road to Avonlea
Hanekonma
Dr. Quinn, Medicine Woman
Carnation (2015)
Good Doctor (2015)
Fratelli detective (2015)
SpongeBob SquarePants
 Oggy and the Cockroaches (اوگی و سوسک ها, now on IRIB Nahal)
New Clifford the Big Red Dog (May 31, 2021 – present )
 Pinkalicious & Peterrific (May 14, 2021 – present)
 Molly of Denali (May 14, 2021 – present )
WordGirl (August 16, 2021 – present)
Donkey Hodie (October 3, 2022 – present)
Thomas and Friends (January 16, 2006 – present)
 Hero Elementary (October 20, 2022)
Alma's Way (2022)
Poppets Town (2023)
Doki (February 2023)
Curious George (Season 10) (May 20, 2022)
Fetch! with Ruff Ruffman (May 20, 2022)
 Wow! Wow! Wubbzy! (March 28 2021)

Upcoming

Kids 
Rosie's Rules (TBA) (Persian titles:TBA)
Percy’s Tiger Tales (2024)
Wonder Pets (March 2023)
Super Why!CaillouWork It Out Wombats!Sid The Science Kid (March 2023)

 Film 

 Kids 

 Annie (2014 film) May 14, 2021
 Toy Story 4 May 31, 2021Penguins of Madagascar'' August 16, 2021

External links

Livestream

Television stations in Iran
Persian-language television stations
Islamic Republic of Iran Broadcasting
Television channels and stations established in 1979
Mass media in Tehran